The Kansas Terrors is a 1939 American Western "Three Mesquiteers" B-movie directed by George Sherman.

Cast
 Robert Livingston as Stony Brooke
 Raymond Hatton as Rusty Joslin
 Duncan Renaldo as Renaldo
 Julie Bishop as Maria del Montez (as Jacqueline Wells)
 Howard C. Hickman as Governor-General del Montez (as Howard Hickman)
 George Douglas as The Commandante
 Frank Lackteen as Captain Gonzales
 Myra Marsh as Maria's Duenna
 Yakima Canutt as The Sergeant
 Ruth Robinson as Juanita
 Richard Alexander as Nico

References

External links
 

1939 films
1939 Western (genre) films
American Western (genre) films
1930s English-language films
American black-and-white films
Films directed by George Sherman
Republic Pictures films
Three Mesquiteers films
1930s American films